S-21: The Khmer Rouge Killing Machine is a 2003 documentary film directed by Rithy Panh. Rithy, himself a survivor of the Khmer Rouge, brought together two former prisoners of the regime with their former captors at Tuol Sleng Genocide Museum, the former Security Prison 21 (S-21) under the Khmer Rouge.

Synopsis
Vann Nath and Chum Mey, two survivors of the Khmer Rouge's Tuol Sleng Prison, are reunited and revisit the former prison, now a museum in Phnom Penh. They meet their former captors – guards, interrogators, a doctor and a photographer – many of whom were barely teenagers during the Khmer Rouge regime of Democratic Kampuchea (DK) era from 1975 to 1979. Their appearances are in stark contrast to the two former prisoners, who are both elderly men. Vann Nath, who was made to paint portraits of prisoners, has a full head of white hair.

The guards and interrogators give a tour of the museum, re-enacting their treatment of the prisoners and daily regimens. They look over the prison's detailed records, including photographs, to refresh their memories.

At one point, Vann Nath directly confronts his former captors about their actions, but they counter that they themselves were also victims, being little more than children at the time, and hold themselves blameless.

Cast
Khieu 'Poev' Ches (Guard)
Yeay Cheu (Him Houy's mother)
Nhiem Ein (Photographer)
Houy Him (Security deputy)
Ta Him (Him Houy's Father)
Nhieb Ho (Guard)
Prakk Kahn (the Torturer)
Peng Kry (Driver)
Som Meth (Guard)
Chum Mey (Survivor)
Vann Nath (Survivor)
Top Pheap (Interrogator & Typist)
Tcheam Seur (Guard)
Mak Thim (S21 Doctor)
Sours Thi (Head of Registers)

Reception
S-21: The Khmer Rouge Killing Machine premiered at the 2003 Cannes Film Festival, where it won the Prix François Chalais. It was also screened at several other film festivals, including the 2003 Toronto International Film Festival (its North American premiere), the New York Film Festival and the Vancouver International Film Festival. It won for best documentary at the Chicago International Film Festival, the European Film Awards and the Valladolid International Film Festival; humanitarian award at the Hong Kong International Film Festival, the FIPRESCI Prize at the Dok Leipzig, a special jury prize at the Copenhagen International Film Festival, and runner-up at the Yamagata International Documentary Film Festival.

In Cambodia, the film was a catalyst for confession about the Cambodian Civil War. Former Khmer Rouge leader Khieu Samphan saw the film and was moved to admit the existence of the prison after years of publicly denying it.

References

External links

2003 films
European Film Awards winners (films)
Khmer-language films
Documentary films about the Cambodian genocide
Films directed by Rithy Panh
2003 documentary films
Cambodian documentary films
French documentary films
2000s French films